Yi Ui-min (Hangul: 이의민, Hanja: 李義旼, (died 7 May 1196) was a military general who dominated the Goryeo government prior to the Mongol Invasions. When his rival, Commander Gyeong Dae-seung, died, Yi Ui-min rose to power in the supreme military council, Jungbang. His tyranny came to an end in 1196 on the 7th day of the 4th lunar month when he was assassinated by General Choe Chung-heon.

Life

Background
Yi Ui-min was born of slave status, and his father Yi Seon (이선, 李善) was a salt trader and his mother a temple servant. According to the History of Goryeo, he was as tall as 1m 90 cm and possessed remarkable physical strength.

Military
Yi entered the capital defense command (경군, 京軍), where his outstanding Subak technique was noticed by the King Uijong and he was promoted to the byeoljang (별장, 別將). In 1170, he got a position of the jungrangjang (중랑장, 中郎將) by the reward of joining the Goryeo warrior rebellion (무신정변). 

In 1173, Kim Bo-dang had attempted to reinstate Uijong who had been dethroned against the grasping political power of Jeong Jung-bu. As a result, Yi had been ordered to return Uijong from his place of exile, Geoje, by rebel forces, only to kill him on his way back in Kyungju. Yi killed Uijong by snapping off his spine with his bare hands. He was said to have burst into a big laughter upon hearing the sound of Uijong's spine breaking. He then rolled up the dead body of Uijong in a blanket and dumped it in a lake. Afterwards, Yi Ui-min was promoted to general (장군, 將軍) in recognition for killing Uijong. 

He then made it to the top post, chief captain (상장군, 上將軍), for the credit of putting down the Revolt of Jo Wi-chong, Governor of Pyongyang in 1174. 

At 1179, when Gyeong Dae-seung, who had an opposite political position against Jeong Jung-bu took the government and pushed away Jeong's people, Yi's power in the government significantly decreased, and his past murder of Uijong became the pretext that Gyeong would use to eliminate him.  
 
Yi had been in fear of an assassination attempt by Gyeong, thus he had placed guards everywhere in around his house. One day, he heard a pleasing rumor that Gyeong was killed. This rumor proved to be wrong though as in fact it had been Heo Seung, a close friend of Gyeong, who had died, not Gyeong himself. As a result of aware of it, Gyeong gave warning of Yi still more, Yi who was seized with fear, run away to Gyeongju on the pretext of illness.

Dictator
When Gyeong died by disease in 1183, King Myeongjong called Yi in to the Gaegyeong. Not believing the death of Gyeong, Yi refused the king's request several times, but finally came to the Gaegyeong after realizing Gyeong's death.

Yi who was commissioned as a susagongjwabokya (수사공좌복야, 守司空左僕射) by Myeongjong had gotten a position of a dongjungseomunhapyeongjangsa panbyeongbusa (동중서문하평장사 판병부사, 同中書門下平章事判兵部事) in 1190 additionally.

Yi who seized the political power, not only took bribes but also extorted private houses and lands. His family also committed many evil deeds. Especially his two sons, Yi Ji-young and Yi Ji-gwang who were called as "ssangdoja" (쌍도자, 雙刀子; meaning 'twin swordsmans') by repute.

Yi Jiyoung committed all sorts of brutality, killing whoever was displaying disobidience to his authority and raping women, regardless of their marital statues. He also kidnapped and raped a royal concubine. Similarly, Choe, Yi's wife, also had a tremendous sexual appetite, which eventually led to her demise after getting kicked out by Yi who had caught her red handed in adulterous intercourse with one of their house servants. Yi's daughter was equally as infamously arrogant and lecherous as to disregard her husband, take up a separate residency and fool around with countless men.

Death and family's downfall
In 1196, having his pigeon snatched away by Ji-young, Yi's son, Choe Chung-soo went to his brother Choe Chung-heon to seek help. The Choe Chung-soo persuaded the Choe Chung-heon to carry out a plot to kill Yi together, to which he agreed after a momentary hesitation.

Yi turns down King Myeongjong's request to accompany him to a Bojesa temple (보제사, 普濟寺) by making an excuse about his ill physical condition and sneaks out to a Mita Mountain cottage. Hearing it, the Choe brothers make their way to the cottage and stakes out the place. They eventually kill Yi, ambushing him when he comes out of the cottage and is about to climb on a horse.

Having successfully carried out the assassination, the Choe brothers immediately head to the Gaegyeong, where they decapitated and exposed head of Yi on the street and call up troops with help from general Baek Jon-yoo. Hearing the news, the Myeongjong at the Bojesa temple hurries his way back to the Gaegyeong.

Yi's sons Ji-sun and Ji-gwang battle against the Choe brothers only to run away in the end after having struggled on the defensive.

As they flee, the Choe brothers lead their troops to the palace to ask the Myeongjong to allow them to put down the remaining insurgents loyal to Yi. With their authority granted by the Myeongjong, the choe brothers close up the castle gates to deter fleeing and went on to detain Yi's followers one by one. Meanwhile, they have general Han Hu capture and kill Yi Ji-young amid his frolick with Kisaengs.

Hearing the news that Yi Ji-yeong had died, many people were said to be comforted and cheered. After then, Choe Chungheon killed all families and relatives of Yi Ui-min, and even sent people to every regions of the nation, wiping out all followers and slaves of Yi's. The survived two sons of Yi Ui-min, Yi Ji-sun and Yi Ji-Gwang,  returned to Choe Chung-heon to beg for mercy and their pardon, but Choe heedlessly killed both of them, eradicating the last of Yi's clan.

Family
Father: Yi Seon (이선)
Mother: Lady Seong (성씨)
Wife: Lady Choi (최씨)
Yi Ji-Yeong (? - 1196) (이지영), first son
Yi Ji-Sun (? - 1196) (이지순), second son
Yi Ji-Gwang (? - 1196) (이지광), third son
Lady Yi, of the Jeongseon Lee clan (정선 이씨), first daughter
Lady Yi, of the Jeongseon Lee clan (정선 이씨), second daughter

In popular culture
 Portrayed by Lee Deok-hwa in the 2003-2004 KBS1 TV series Age of Warriors.

References

1196 deaths
12th-century Korean people
Goryeo Buddhists
Korean generals
Year of birth unknown
Leaders ousted by a coup
Deaths by decapitation
Male murder victims
Regents of Korea
Jeongseon Lee clan